Julien Brouillette (born December 5, 1986) is a Canadian former professional ice hockey defenseman who played in the National Hockey League (NHL) with the Washington Capitals and Winnipeg Jets.

Playing career
As a youth, Brouillette played in the 2000 Quebec International Pee-Wee Hockey Tournament with a minor ice hockey team from Lanaudière.

In 2007, he turned professional signing as an undrafted player with the Columbia Inferno of the ECHL going with the team into the playoffs. In 2008, he signed with the Charlotte Checkers of the ECHL. He played there for two seasons and the team went to the playoffs both years. During the 2009 season, he played for both the Providence Bruins and Hartford Wolf Pack of the AHL.

In the 2010–11 season Brouillette signed with the Greenville Road Warriors of the ECHL. On December 14, he was loaned to the Lake Erie Monsters of the AHL and signed a Professional Tryout with the team. On January 23, 2011, he was signed to a Standard Players Contract with the Monsters ending his contract with the Road Warriors. He remained with the Monsters for the duration of the season, posting career highs of 2 goals and 19 points in 49 games. Following the Monsters first round elimination, Brouillette was returned to the Road Warriors on loan to play in their final post season game.

On July 11, 2011, Brouillette was signed to a one-year contract with the Hershey Bears of the AHL for the 2011–12 season. In playing a career high 74 games, Brouillette was a fixture on the Bears defense, to post 7 goals and 21 points. In the 2012–13 season, his second within the Bears organization, Brouillette was reassigned to ECHL affiliate, the Reading Royals, to begin the year as a flow on effect of the NHL lockout. After 1 game with the Royals, Brouillette was recalled to Hershey and reclaimed his position to contribute with 7 points in 61 contests.

On April 5, 2013, Brouillette signed his first NHL contract, a one-year deal with NHL affiliate, the Washington Capitals, for the following 2013–14 season. Midway through the season whilst with the Bears, Brouillette received his first ever NHL recall by the Capitals on February 6, 2014. He made his long-awaited NHL debut the following night, providing a primary assist in a 4-2 victory over the Winnipeg Jets in Washington. In his second game, Brouillette scored his first NHL goal, which stood as the game-winner in a 3-0 victory over the New Jersey Devils on February 8, 2014.

On August 8, 2014, Brouillette signed as a free agent to a one-year, two-way contract with the Winnipeg Jets. After competing in the Jets training camp, Brouillette was assigned to AHL affiliate, the St. John's IceCaps to begin the 2014–15 season. Brouillette would play the majority of the season with the IceCaps, however earned a recall to feature in one game with the Jets.

On June 1, 2015, approaching free-agency, Brouillette opted to leave the NHL and sign his first European contract on a one-year deal with newly promoted Swedish club, Karlskrona HK of the Swedish Hockey League (SHL). In his only season abroad in the 2015–16 season, Brouillette captained Karlskrona and appeared in 52 games, contributing with 5 goals and 17 points from the blueline.

Brouillette opted to return to his native Canada as a free agent in the following summer. Unable to attract interest to sign in the NHL, Brouillette initially agreed to a one-month contract in the LNAH with Saint-Georges Cool FM 103.5 on September 16, 2016. He featured in 8 games with Saint-Georges before he signed a professional try-out deal to return to the St. John's IceCaps of the AHL, now an affiliate to the Montreal Canadiens on November 4, 2016.

On July 16, 2017, he signed with EC Red Bull Salzburg of the Austrian Hockey League (EBEL). In the 2017–18 season, Brouillette as Salzburg's top pairing defenseman led the blueline in scoring with 12 goals and 34 points in 52 games. In the post-season, Brouillette helped Salzburg reach the final as Austrian Champions, before losing in game 7 to HC Bolzano.

Brouillette opted to end his 11-year professional career following the conclusion of his contract with Salzburg on April 24, 2018.

Career statistics

References

External links

1986 births
Living people
Canadian ice hockey defencemen
Charlotte Checkers (1993–2010) players
Charlotte Checkers (2010–) players
Chicoutimi Saguenéens (QMJHL) players
Columbia Inferno players
Greenville Road Warriors players
Hartford Wolf Pack players
Hershey Bears players
Ice hockey people from Quebec
Karlskrona HK players
Lake Erie Monsters players
People from Centre-du-Québec
Providence Bruins players
Reading Royals players
EC Red Bull Salzburg players
Saint-Georges Cool FM 103.5 players
St. John's IceCaps players
Undrafted National Hockey League players
Washington Capitals players
Winnipeg Jets players
Canadian expatriate ice hockey players in Austria
Canadian expatriate ice hockey players in Sweden